Dürnstein in der Steiermark is a former municipality in the district of Murau in Styria, Austria. Since the 2015 Styria municipal structural reform, it is part of the municipality Neumarkt in der Steiermark.

Geography
Dürnstein in der Steiermark lies about 20 km southeast of Murau and about 5 km north of Friesach.

References

Cities and towns in Murau District